The 1982 New York City Marathon was the 13th edition of the New York City Marathon and took place in New York City on 24 October.

Results

Men

Women

References

External links

New York City Marathon, 1982
Marathon
New York City Marathon
New York